Terrance Randolph Metcalf (born September 24, 1951) is an American former professional football player who was a running back for six seasons in the National Football League (NFL), five of them with the St. Louis Cardinals and one with the Washington Redskins. He also played three seasons in the Canadian Football League (CFL) with the Toronto Argonauts.

Born and raised in Seattle, Washington, Metcalf played college football at California State College, Long Beach in Southern California. He is the father of former NFL wide receiver and kick returner Eric Metcalf.

Metcalf finished his NFL career with 3,489 rushing yards, 245 receptions for 2,457 yards, 936 punt return yards, and 3,087 yards returning kickoffs. He also scored 36 touchdowns (24 rushing, 9 receiving, 1 punt return, 2 kickoff returns). He holds the record for most games with 250+ all purpose yards: 7.

In the 14-game 1975 season, Metcalf set a then-NFL record for combined yards with 2,462. This feat has since been eclipsed during the 16-game era (instituted in 1978), with Lionel James of the San Diego Chargers being the first to do so in 1985. James' head coach was Don Coryell, who also coached Metcalf during his record-setting season.  He also became the first player in NFL history to average at least 30 yards per kick return and 10 yards per punt return in the same season.  Joshua Cribbs of the Cleveland Browns became the second in 2007.

In 1978, Metcalf jumped to the Toronto Argonauts.  He played three full seasons in the Canadian Football League. In 1978, he rushed 169 times for 669 yards, and caught 31 passes. In 1979, he carried the ball 141 times for 691 yards and caught 55 passes, and in his final year, 1980, he rushed for 540 yards and caught 51 passes. While he was a division all star in 1979, his rushing average is below the 5 yards per carry expected by a good running back in the CFL (with its three down game) and his performance in Toronto was seen as underwhelming.

Metcalf finished his career in the NFL with the Redskins in 1981. He was inducted into the St. Louis Sports Hall of Fame in 2018. and the Missouri Sports Hall of Fame in 2020.

Coaching career
Metcalf coached at Renton High School in Renton, Washington until 2008.

References

External links

1951 births
Living people
American football return specialists
American football running backs
Canadian football running backs
Long Beach State 49ers football players
St. Louis Cardinals (football) players
Toronto Argonauts players
Washington Redskins players
High school football coaches in Washington (state)
National Conference Pro Bowl players
Sportspeople from Renton, Washington
Players of American football from Seattle
Players of Canadian football from Seattle
African-American coaches of American football
African-American players of American football
African-American players of Canadian football
21st-century African-American people
20th-century African-American sportspeople